The Man in the Trunk is a 1942 American comedy film directed by Malcolm St. Clair and written by John Larkin. The film stars Lynne Roberts, George Holmes, Raymond Walburn, J. Carrol Naish, Dorothy Peterson and Eily Malyon. The film was released on September 18, 1942, by 20th Century Fox.

Plot

Cast   
Lynne Roberts as Peggy LaRue
George Holmes as Dick Burke
Raymond Walburn as Jim Cheevers
J. Carrol Naish as Reginald DeWinters
Dorothy Peterson as Lola DeWinters
Eily Malyon as Abbie Addison
Arthur Loft as Sam Kohler
Milton Parsons as Doctor Pluma
Matt McHugh as Detective Murtha
Charles Cane as Police Lieut. Braley
Theodore von Eltz as Theodore Swann
Joan Marsh as Yvonne Duvalle
Syd Saylor as Joe
Douglas Fowley as Ed Mygatt
Tim Ryan as Auctioneer
Vivien Oakland as Mrs. Tessie Sweeney Kohler

References

External links 
 

1942 films
1940s English-language films
20th Century Fox films
American comedy films
1942 comedy films
Films directed by Malcolm St. Clair
Films scored by Cyril J. Mockridge
American black-and-white films
1940s American films